is a Japanese manga series written and illustrated by Mashiro. It began serialization on Comic Smart's Ganma! manga website in March 2019. As of October 2022, the series' individual chapters have been collected into six volumes. An anime television series adaptation by Madhouse is set to premiere in April 2023.

Characters

Media

Manga
Written and illustrated by Mashiro, the series began serialization on Comic Smart's Ganma! manga website on March 7, 2019. Media Factory is publishing the series in print under their MF Comics imprint. As of October 2022, six tankōbon volumes have been released.

Mangamo is publishing the series in English digitally simultaneously with its Japanese release.

Volume list

Anime
An anime television series adaptation, titled My Love Story with Yamada-kun at Lv999 (different English translation of the same Japanese title), was announced during the Aniplex Online Fest 2022 event on September 24, 2022. It is produced by Madhouse and directed by Morio Asaka, with scripts written by Yasuhiro Nakanishi, character designs by Kunihiko Hamada, and music composed by Mito and De De Mouse. The series is set to premiere on April 2, 2023 on Tokyo MX and other networks.

Reception
In the 2020 Next Manga Award, the series ranked ninth in the web manga category. In the same month, the series was nomimated for pixiv and Nippon Shuppan Hanbai, Inc's Web Manga General Election. In the 2021 Next Manga Award, the series ranked fourth in the web manga category. At AnimeJapan 2021, the series ranked ninth in a poll asking people what manga they most wanted to see adapted into an anime. In the 2021 Tsutaya Comic Award, the series ranked sixth. In 2022, the series won the grand prize in the Tsutaya Comic Award.

The series has one million copies in circulation between its digital and print releases.

References

External links
 
 

2023 anime television series debuts
Anime series based on manga
Aniplex
Japanese webcomics
Madhouse (company)
Media Factory manga
Romantic comedy anime and manga
Shōjo manga
Tokyo MX original programming
Webcomics in print